The Salem Red Sox are a Minor League Baseball affiliate of the Boston Red Sox of Major League Baseball (MLB), based in Salem, an independent city adjacent to Roanoke, Virginia. The team competes at the Single-A level in the Carolina League. Home games are played at Haley Toyota Field at Salem Memorial Ballpark, a 6,300-seat facility opened in 1995.

The team first played in 1955, and then from 1957 to 1967, in the Appalachian League, initially at the now-defunct Class D level and then at the Rookie level starting in 1963. From 1968 through 2020, the team competed in the Carolina League, initially Class A and then Class A-Advanced starting in 1990.

Prior to adopting the Red Sox name in 2009, the team was known as the Salem Avalanche from 1995 through 2008, when it was affiliated with the Colorado Rockies (1995–2002) and Houston Astros (2003–2008). Prior to 1995, the franchise played under several other names and affiliations.

History

The franchise debuted in 1955 and was initially known as the Salem Rebels, an affiliate of the Pittsburgh Pirates.

The franchise was owned from 1986 until 2006 by Kelvin Bowles, a cable television executive and scout in Major League Baseball. Bowles, who scouted for the Boston Red Sox from 2002 to 2005, bought the team when it was in danger of moving from Salem. In 2006, the team was sold to a pair of businessmen from Atlanta who also owned the Fort Wayne Wizards.  In December 2007, this group sold the team to Fenway Sports Group, a subsidiary of the Boston Red Sox ownership group, preparing the team for an affiliation change after its Player Development Contract with the Houston Astros ended in 2008.  As such, the Salem Red Sox are owned by the same parent company that manages Liverpool F.C. and the Boston Red Sox.

In 2006, Salem Memorial Ballpark hosted the All Star Game between the Carolina League and California League.

Since switching affiliation to Boston in 2009, the team has claimed four division titles (2009, 2013, 2016, 2019), has made five playoff appearances (each division title season, plus 2014 as a wild card), and has won one league championship (2013). League and divisional titles are commemorated on the press box and sky boxes overlooking the Haley Toyota Field Grandstand.

In conjunction with Major League Baseball's restructuring of Minor League Baseball in 2021, the team moved from being the Red Sox' Class A-Advanced affiliate to being their Low-A affiliate, and became a member of the Low-A East league; in a corresponding move, the Greenville Drive moved from Class A to High-A.  At the time of the restructuring, the website Ballpark Digest speculated that the Red Sox could look to move the Salem franchise to Lowell, Massachusetts in time for the 2022 season. In May 2021, Rick White, president of the Atlantic League of Professional Baseball, announced that Salem, along with Staten Island, New York, was "on board for 2022" as an expansion franchise location, further fueling speculation that Salem would lose their affiliation status to Lowell. In 2022, the Low-A East became known as the Carolina League, the name historically used by the regional circuit prior to the 2021 reorganization.

On the 17th of March 2023, it was announced that their owners, FSG, sold them to Diamond Baseball Holdings who also own the Red Sox Double-A affiliate, the Portland Sea Dogs.

Location and rivalry games
While the team is located in a relatively small city (population circa 25,000) when compared to other teams of its classification, the Red Sox are strongly identified with the Roanoke Valley as a whole, drawing fans from neighboring cities and counties within the roughly 300,000-person metropolitan area. The connection with neighboring Roanoke was emphasized during the 2017 Carolina League All-Star Classic, hosted by Salem, that was represented by a logo featuring the iconic Mill Mountain Star. Salem is also located in the Blue Ridge Mountains, which are featured prominently on the team's logo and are clearly visible over Haley Toyota Field's outfield walls. This mountain view includes the aforementioned star, visible on clear nights over the left field wall.

The Red Sox share their stadium with the NCAA Division III Roanoke Maroons and have previously hosted the "Hokie-Smokey Classic" baseball series between the Tennessee Volunteers and the nearby Virginia Tech Hokies.

Given the teams' close proximity, their long-time histories in the league, and both competing in the Carolina League's North Division, Salem's chief rival is the Lynchburg Hillcats. The regular matchups of these teams, known as the "460 Series", named for U.S. Route 460 which connects the cities, has occasionally feature day/night doubleheaders during which two games will be split between the two cities over the course of the same day.

Season-by-season records

Salem has competed in two different leagues and at four different classification levels:
 Appalachian League (1955, 1957–1967)
 Class D (1955, 1957–1962)
 Rookie (1963–1967)
 Carolina League (1968–2020)
 Class A (1968–1989)
 Class A-Advanced (1990–2020)
 Class A (2021–present)

Note that while records in the below table are for entire seasons, the Carolina League has played a split-season schedule since 1970, except for 2020, when minor-league seasons were canceled, and 2021, when it operated as Low-A East. In years when a split-season was played, a team may have earned a division title by finishing first in either half of the season, despite not having the best overall record for the entire season. Alternately, a team may have had the best overall record for the entire season, but did not finish first in either half of the season, thus did not earn a division title.

Source:

Notable former players

At least two inductees to the National Baseball Hall of Fame played for Salem; Orlando Cepeda, who played 26 games for the Rebels in 1955, and Larry Walker, who played two rehabilitation games with the Avalanche in 1996.

Tim Murtaugh was a player, manager, and player-manager for Salem; he played 38 games for the 1965 Rebels, he managed the 1971 Rebels, and he appeared in 10 games while managing the 1972 Pirates.

Mario Mendoza played 136 games for Salem in 1972, registering a .221 batting average, slightly above the Mendoza Line that is named for him.

Daisuke Matsuzaka made a rehabilitation start for Salem in September 2009, in a Carolina League playoff game against the Winston-Salem Dash, and later made a regular-season rehabilitation start for Salem in 2012.

For notable players who made appearances with Salem, see:
 List of Salem Red Sox players (affiliated with Boston)
 List of Salem Avalanche players (affiliated with Houston and Colorado)
 List of Salem Buccaneers players (affiliated with Pittsburgh)
 List of Salem Redbirds players (affiliated with Texas and San Diego)
 List of Salem Pirates players (affiliated with Pittsburgh)
 List of Salem Rebels players (affiliated with Pittsburgh and San Francisco)

Club records

Batting: .370 – Oswaldo Olivares, 1977
Hits: 208 – Oswaldo Olivares, 1977
Doubles: 43 – Garrett Atkins, 2001
Triples: 17 – David Arrington, 1968
Home Runs: 34 – Gerald Davis, 1981
Total Bases: 280 – Oswaldo Olivares, 1977
Runs Batted In: 103 – Gerald Davis, 1981
Stolen Bases: 84 – Miguel Diloné, 1975
Wins: 16 – Jim Minshall 1972
Losses: 15 – Frank Brosious, 1983; James McKee, 1970
Strikeouts: 186 – Ed Whitson, 1976; Doug Bair, 1972
Walks: 127 – Benjamin Willbank, 1978
Innings Pitched: 203 – Ed Whitson, 1976
Earned Run Average: 2.11 – Josh Kalinowski, 1999
Saves: 27 – Travis Thompson, 1999

Media information

Media Relations Manager: Ben Gellman
Flagship radio station: 
 The Salem Red Sox Broadcast, WGMN AM 1240 (Roanoke)
Radio announcers: Melanie Newman
Number of games broadcast: All
Newspapers covering the Red Sox: 
 The Roanoke Times 
 Salem Times-Register
Official scorer: Billy Wells
Public Address: Emile Brown

Team mascots

Lefty and Righty, the team's newest mascots; two person-sized red socks, each wearing a Boston Red Sox hat; one has an "L" on its back, the other has an "R".

Mugsy, a St. Bernard mascot who made his rookie debut in professional baseball in 1997 with the Avalanche. According to the team's website, Mugsy descended from the passing Hale-Bopp comet that raced across the Roanoke Valley sky on April 4, 1997.

Misty, a female saint bernard mascot who joined the team in 2005.

Big Mo, the Salem Avalanche's Kid's Club mascot; a giant abominable snowman.

The Baseball Nut, the Avalanche's first mascot, which resembled an almond.  While the idea was original, the Baseball Nut proved to be unpopular.  Lacking a cute or friendly appearance, the mascot intimidated children and was an object of derision by adult fans.  Mugsy was developed as a replacement.

Roster

Notes

References

Further reading

External links
 
 Statistics from Baseball-Reference
 Salem Baseball Booster Club

 
Baseball teams established in 1955
Baseball in Salem, Virginia
Professional baseball teams in Virginia
Carolina League teams
Boston Red Sox minor league affiliates
Colorado Rockies minor league affiliates
Pittsburgh Pirates minor league affiliates
Texas Rangers minor league affiliates
San Diego Padres minor league affiliates
San Francisco Giants minor league affiliates
Houston Astros minor league affiliates
1955 establishments in Virginia